Banzai charge is the term that was used by the Allied forces of World War II to refer to Japanese human wave attacks and swarming staged by infantry units. This term came from the Japanese battle cry , and was shortened to banzai, specifically referring to the tactic used by the Imperial Japanese Army during the Pacific War. This tactic was used when the Japanese commanders of infantry battalions foresaw that a battle was about to be lost, as a last ditch effort in thwarting Allied Forces.

Origin 

The origin of the term is a classical Chinese phrase in the 7th-century Book of Northern Qi, which states "", "A true man would [rather] be the shattered jewel, ashamed to be the intact tile." Among the rules there existed a code of honor that was later used by Japanese military governments.

With the revolutionary change in the Meiji Restoration and frequent wars against China and Russia, the militarist government of Japan adopted the concepts of Bushido to condition the country's population to be ideologically obedient to the emperor. Impressed with how samurais were trained to commit suicide when a great humiliation was about to befall them, the government taught troops that it was a greater humiliation to surrender to the enemy than to die. The suicide of Saigō Takamori, the leader of old samurai during the Meiji Restoration, also inspired the nation to idealize and romanticize death in battle and to consider suicide an honorable final action.

During the Siege of Port Arthur human wave attacks were conducted on Russian artillery and machine guns by the Japanese which ended up becoming suicidal. Since the Japanese suffered massive casualties in the attacks, one description of the aftermath was that "[a] thick, unbroken mass of corpses covered the cold earth like a coverlet".

In the 1930s, the Japanese found this type of attack to be effective in China. It became an accepted military tactic in the Imperial Japanese Army, where numerically weaker Japanese forces, using their superior training and bayonets, were able to defeat larger Chinese forces. The Japanese here did not face massed automatic weapons but rather the bolt-action rifle of the Chinese, which could not fire as rapidly as a machine gun.

World War II 

During the war period, the Japanese militarist government disseminated propaganda that romanticized suicide attacks, using one of the virtues of Bushido as the basis for the campaign. The Japanese government presented war as purifying, with death defined as a duty. By the end of 1944, the government announced the last protocol, unofficially named , implying the will of sacrificing the entire Japanese population of 100 million, if necessary, for the purpose of resisting opposition forces.

It was used extensively by the Japanese in China, especially against Chinese soldiers without machine guns or automatic weapons, though it was less effective against those who had machine guns.

During the U.S. raid on Makin Island, on August 17, 1942, the U.S. Marine Raiders attacking the island initially spotted and then killed Japanese machine gunners. The Japanese defenders then launched a banzai charge with bayonets and swords, but were stopped by American firepower. The pattern was repeated in further attacks, with similar results.
 
During the Guadalcanal campaign, on August 21, 1942, Colonel Kiyonao Ichiki led 800 soldiers in a direct attack on the American line guarding Henderson Field in the Battle of the Tenaru. After small-scale combat engagement in the jungle, Ichiki's army mounted a banzai charge on the enemy; however, against an organized American defense line, most of the Japanese soldiers were killed and Ichiki subsequently committed suicide.

On May 29, 1943, during the Battle of Attu, the beleaguered Japanese soldiers led by Colonel Yasuyo Yamasaki on Attu Island, Alaska, launched a massive banzai charge through American lines near Massacre Bay. Despite intense fighting, the Japanese force was quickly wiped out. At the end of the battle, only 28 remained of the Japanese force which had originally numbered roughly 2,600, while the Americans lost 549 combatants out of 15,000.

The largest banzai charge of the war took place during the Battle of Saipan. General Yoshitsugu Saitō gathered almost 4,300 Japanese soldiers, walking wounded and some civilians, many unarmed, and ordered the charge. On July 7, 1944, it slammed directly into the Army's 1st and 2nd Battalions of the 105th Infantry Regiment, which lost almost 2,000 men in the 15-hour pitched battle. The attack was ultimately repulsed, and almost all the Japanese soldiers taking part in the charge were killed. 

During the Soviet invasion of Manchuria, as the 1st Red Banner Army invaded Mutanchiang, the Soviet 5th Army to the south continued its advance westward, enveloping and destroying the Japanese 278th Infantry Regiment, the survivors of which mounted a last-ditch banzai charge rather than surrender. By the end of the day, all of Mutanchiang had fallen into Soviet hands, and the battle for the city was over. Shortly afterward, the main strength of the Kwantung Army laid down its arms in surrender as per the Emperor's broadcast. The Battle of Mutanchiang, and World War II, had come to an end.

Some Japanese commanders, such as General Tadamichi Kuribayashi, forbade their men from carrying out Banzai charges. Indeed, the Americans were surprised that the Japanese did not employ banzai charges at the Battle of Iwo Jima.

See also 
 Wansui, Banzai
 Banzai Cliff
 Suicide Cliff
 Kamikaze – aerial Suicide attacks used by the Japanese in WWII - Japanese Special Attack Units
 Jibakutai
 Human wave attack

References

Sources
 

Military history of Japan
Imperial Japanese Army
World War II suicide weapons of Japan
Pacific theatre of World War II
Aleutian Islands campaign
Assault tactics